In enzymology, a sterigmatocystin 8-O-methyltransferase is an enzyme that catalyzes the chemical reaction

S-adenosyl-L-methionine + sterigmatocystin  S-adenosyl-L-homocysteine + 8-O-methylsterigmatocystin

Thus, the two substrates of this enzyme are S-adenosyl methionine and sterigmatocystin, whereas its two products are S-adenosylhomocysteine and 8-O-methylsterigmatocystin.

This enzyme belongs to the family of transferases, specifically those transferring one-carbon group methyltransferases.  The systematic name of this enzyme class is S-adenosyl-L-methionine:sterigmatocystin 8-O-methyltransferase. Other names in common use include sterigmatocystin methyltransferase, O-methyltransferase II, sterigmatocystin 7-O-methyltransferase (incorrect), S-adenosyl-L-methionine:sterigmatocystin 7-O-methyltransferase, and (incorrect).

References

 
 

EC 2.1.1
Enzymes of unknown structure